Paulo Amotun Lokoro (born 1 January 1992) is a South Sudanese track and field athlete now living in Kenya. He specializes in the 1500 metres event. Lokoro was selected as one of the ten members of the Refugee Olympic Team for the 2016 Summer Olympics and the 2020 Summer Olympics.

Originally a cattle farmer in southern Sudan, he fled his home to Kenya in 2006 to escape a war.

Competitions

References

1992 births
Living people
South Sudanese male middle-distance runners
Olympic male middle-distance runners
South Sudanese refugees
Athletes (track and field) at the 2016 Summer Olympics
Athletes (track and field) at the 2020 Summer Olympics
Refugee Olympic Team at the 2016 Summer Olympics
Refugee Olympic Team at the 2020 Summer Olympics
South Sudanese expatriate sportspeople in Kenya